Swim is the fourth EP by American rock band Emily's Army, released on July 22, 2014, through Burger Records and Rise Records. The album is the band's first release on Burger Records and last on Rise Records. The album was produced by drummer Joey Armstrong's father, Billie Joe Armstrong. It is the band's last release under their former name "Emily's Army" after changing their name to "Swimmers" in late 2014, and later "SWMRS" in late 2015 It is also the last record to feature lead guitarist Travis Neumann and last to feature Max on bass before switching to lead guitar.

Background
This is the first music of the band's to feature their "beach pop" and "power pop" sound. Lead guitarist Travis Neumann left after the recording of the EP but was featured in the music video for "Aliens Landing". The album was once again produced by Billie Joe Armstrong. The album is mixed by Chris Dugan and mastered by Chris Mathers and Matthew Voelker. The band toured in summer 2014 with Rise Against in support of the EP.

Track list

Personnel
Credits for Swim adapted from liner notes.
Emily's Army
 Cole Becker – lead vocals,  rhythm guitar 
 Max Becker – lead vocals, bass, art direction
 Joey Armstrong – drums, percussion, backing vocals
 Travis Neumann  – lead guitar, backing vocals

Additional personal
 Billie Joe Armstrong – production
 Chris Dugan – mixing 
 Chris Mathers – engineering 
 Matthew Voelker – engineering 
 Mike Wells – mastering 
 Natalie Nesser – photography

References

2014 albums
SWMRS albums